Mutisia magnifica is a species of flowering plant in the family Asteraceae. It is found only in Loja province, Ecuador. Its natural habitat is subtropical or tropical moist montane forests. It is threatened by habitat loss.

References

Further reading
 Carmen Ulloa Ulloa, Peter Møller Jørgensen 1996. A new species of Mutisia (Compositae-Mutisieae) from Ecuador. Novon 6(1): 131–133. jstor, first page full paper and photo.

magnifica
Endemic flora of Ecuador
Vulnerable plants
Taxonomy articles created by Polbot